Ahmad Takhiyuddin bin Roslan (born 13 May 1993) is a Malaysian footballer who plays for Terengganu II as an attacking midfielder.

Career statistics

Club

References

External links
 

1993 births
Living people
Malaysian footballers
Terengganu F.C. II players
People from Terengganu
Association football midfielders